Min Hi Line is a proposed linear park and shared-use path that would eventually re-purpose an active rail and agri-industrial corridor in the Longfellow community of Minneapolis, Minnesota, United States. Two pilot projects completed in 2018 and 2019 connect the Min Hi Line corridor to trail systems at its northern and southern ends.

History 
The proposed area for the Min Hi Line is used by Canadian Pacific Railway, Archer Daniels Midland, Leder Brothers Metal, and General Mills.  After Archer Daniel Midland ceases operations in the area, the century-old Atkinson Mill structure at East 38th Street will be the last remaining active grain mill left in the city of Minneapolis. The grain silos and milling structures are a defining feature of the local neighborhood, and could be incorporated into future redevelopment. Long-term city plans envision parks and open space for the freight rail tracks. A community group, Min Hi Line Coalition, has publicized issues related to reuse of the industrial corridor.

Pilot projects

Greenway connection 
A pathway built in 2019 along the east side of Hiawatha Avenue from East 32nd Avenue to East 28th Avenue, though technically part of the Hiawatha LRT Trail, is also referred to as the northernmost segment of the Min Hi Line.

Minnehaha Park connection 
A housing and retail development at East 46th Avenue and Snelling Avenue features a pathway to Nawadaha Boulevard that is considered the south end of the Min Hi Line.

Route 
Min Hi Line is named after the Minnehaha-Hiawatha freight rail corridor between Hiawatha Avenue and Snelling Avenue/Cheatham Avenue (formerly Dight Avenue). At its northern end, it reaches the Midtown Greenway, and at its southern end it reaches the Minnehaha Falls park area. The approximately  pathway would be at-grade, crossing 12 streets along its north–south course. Trail users could connect to many other shared-use paths in the area, such as Hiawatha LRT Trail, Little Earth Trail, and Grand Rounds trail network. The Min Hi Line corridor features many multi-unit housing complexes and business. The Min Hi Line would contrast with bike highways that are used almost exclusively for transportation and recreation. Designed for more moderately-paced activities, the linear park and pathway would increase social connectedness and green the urban environment.

Nearby sites

Attractions 
 Hiawatha Avenue Mural on the Harvest States grain elevator by artist Sara Rotholz Weiner. 
Lake Street shopping district
Minnehaha Mile boutique and vintage shopping district
 Minnehaha Regional Park
Purple Rain house of "The Kid" historic landmark

Neighborhoods 
Longfellow community: Cooper, Hiawatha, Howe, and Longfellow
West of Hiawatha Avenue: Corcoran, Ericsson, and Standish

Transportation 
Metro Blue Line
Lake Street/Midtown Station
38th Street Station
46th Street Station
Shared-use paths
Grand Rounds
Hiawatha LRT Trail
Little Earth Trail
Midtown Greenway
Streets
Hiawatha Avenue
Lake Street

See also 
 Cycling in Minnesota
 Cycling infrastructure
Greenway
List of shared-use paths in Minneapolis
 Metro Transit
 Rail trail

References

External links 
 Minneapolis 2040: The City's Comprehensive Plan

Bike paths in Minnesota
Greenways
Parks in Minneapolis
Rail trails in Minnesota
Shared-use paths in Minneapolis
Transportation in Minneapolis